Steve Tibbetts is the debut album by Steve Tibbetts, recorded in 1976. Eventually released by Frammis Records in 1979, the CD was reissued by Cuneiform in 1995.

Critical reception
The New Rolling Stone Record Guide wrote that Tibbets "uses a few too many cliches, [but] proves that he has the talent to make those cliches work." The Billboard Guide to Progressive Music called the album "a classic of instrumental psychedelic progressive music from the unlikely region of grassroots middle America."

Track listing
All songs written by Steve Tibbetts

"Sunrise" - 4:14
"The Secret" - 4:49
"Desert" - 4:39
"The Wonderful Day" - 2:20
"Gong" - 1:43
"Jungle Rhythm" - 5:37
"Interlude" - 1:52
"Alvin Goes to Tibet" - 4:16
"How Do You Like My Buddha?" - 5:06

Personnel
Steve Tibbetts - Instruments, tape effects, vocals and engineering
Tim Weinhold - percussion
First released on Frammis Records 1977
Photo by Walter Goldstein
Art by Frammis

Reissue
CD Mastering by SAE Digital Mastering
CD Graphic Production by Paula Millett 
Reissue coordination by Steve Feigenbaum

References

External links
Cuneiform Bio for re-release of “First Album”
Steve Tibbetts at Discogs

1977 debut albums
Steve Tibbetts albums